Melicope remyi, synonym Platydesma remyi, the Hawai'i pilo kea, is a species of plant in the family Rutaceae. It is endemic to the island of Hawaii.  It is threatened by habitat loss. It is on the IUCN Red List of Endangered species.

References

remyi
Endemic flora of Hawaii
Biota of Hawaii (island)
Taxonomy articles created by Polbot
Taxobox binomials not recognized by IUCN